The 2019 WAFU Zone B Women's Cup was the second edition of the international women's football event for teams from Zone B of the West African Football Union (WAFU). The competition was hosted by Ivory Coast, and Ghana were the defending champions. All team had  participate only Benin  did not enter . Nigeria defeated Ivory Coast through penalties in the final to win their first trophy in the tournament. Uchenna Kanu topped the scorers chart with ten goals.

Draw
The draws were made on April 16, 2019 in Abidjan, Ivory Coast, with May 8 set for the opening game. The tournament was also highlighted as preparation for Football at the Summer Olympics qualifiers for some of the teams. Robert Champroux Stadium and Stade du Parc des Sports were retained as venues.

Squad 
Nigeria's manager, Thomas Dennerby released his 20-man squad for the tournament on May 6.
Ghana's manager, named the full squad

Group stage

Group A

Group B

Knockout stage

Semi finals

Third place

Final

References

External links
 Cafonline
 BBC Report

West African Football Union competitions
WAFU Zone B Women's Cup